Rasmus Reihdar Nissen (born 25 June 2001) is a Danish professional forward, who plays as a centre-back for Næsby.

Club career

OB
With a past at OKS, Næsby Boldklub and a short spell at SønderjyskE, Nissen joined OB as a youth player. He got his official debut for OB on 8 July 2020, playing the whole game against Silkeborg IF in the Danish Superliga.

After a good season with 10 goals and 5 assist in 15 games with OB's U19 team – who won the 2019–20 U19 league – Nissen signed his first two-year professional contract on 15 July 2020, which also included a promotion to the first team squad. However, in February 2021 out of a sudden, Nissen was told that he had no future in OB and was sent down to play and train with the U19s again.

On 21 June 2021 it was confirmed, that Nissen had signed a one-year loan deal with newly relegated Danish 2nd Division club Kolding IF, effective from 1 July.

Later career
On 11 July 2022 it was confirmed, that Nissen had signed with Faroese club B36 Tórshavn. After six month in the Faroe Islands, Nissen returned to Denmark and signed with his former team, Næsby Boldklub.

References

External links
 

2001 births
Living people
Danish men's footballers
Danish expatriate men's footballers
Association football forwards
Footballers from Odense
Odense Kammeraternes Sportsklub players
Næsby Boldklub players
SønderjyskE Fodbold players
Odense Boldklub players
Kolding IF players
B36 Tórshavn players
Danish Superliga players
Expatriate footballers in the Faroe Islands